The Miss Georgia USA competition is the pageant that selects the representative for the state of Georgia in the Miss USA pageant. This pageant is directed Greenwood Productions under the ownership of Miss Tennessee USA 1989 Kim Greenwood and it is hosted in McDonough, Georgia.

Georgia has had a fair success at Miss USA, and has yet to win the title. The best placement was Erin Nance, who placed 1st runner-up in 1993, and many 2nd and 4th runner-ups. The most recent placement was Alyssa Beasley in 2020, placing Top 16.

Four former Miss Georgia Teen USAs went on to win this competition, but only three titleholders has previously competed at Miss America. One represented Connecticut.

Rachel Russaw of Atlanta was crowned Miss Georgia USA 2023 on November 19, 2022 at Henry County Performing Arts Center in McDonough. She will represent Georgia for the title of Miss USA 2023.

Results summary
1st Runner-Up: Erin Nance (1993)
2nd Runners-Up: Tami Tesch (1986), Donna Rampy (1988), Tiffany Fallon (2001), Lisa Wilson (2006), Tiana Griggs (2014), Emanii Davis  (2016)
3rd Runners-Up: Dorothy Taylor (1959)
4th Runners-Up: Carolann Connor (1955), Diane Austin (1958), Cherie Stephens (1970), Sophia Bowen (1987), Michele Nemeth (1989), Jasmyn "Jazz" Wilkins (2012)
Top 5/6: Brenda Leithleiter (1990), Jennifer Prodgers (1992), Patti Dunn (2000)
Top 10/12: Liz Wickersham (1976), Linda Kerr (1977), Lisa Condre (1981), Dotsy Timm (1983), Caroline Medley (2004), Marianny Egurrola (2018)
Top 15/16: Kimberly Gittings (2009), Kaylin Reque (2011), Alyssa Beasley (2020)

Georgia holds a record of 26 placements at Miss USA.

Awards
Miss Photogenic: Liz Wickersham (1976), Sophia Bowen (1987)

Titleholders 

Color key

 

1 Age at the time of the Miss USA pageant

References

External links
 Official Website

Georgia
Georgia (U.S. state) culture
Women in Georgia (U.S. state)
Recurring events established in 1952
1952 establishments in Georgia (U.S. state)
Annual events in Georgia (U.S. state)